The South West Division may refer to:

South West Land Division, a cadastral division of Western Australia
Queensland Rugby League South West Division
English Rugby Union South West Division